Taj's Blues is a compilation album by American blues artist Taj Mahal.

Track listing
 "Leaving Trunk" (Sleepy John Estes) - 4:48 - from Taj Mahal (1968)
 "Statesboro Blues" (Blind Willie McTell) - 2:56 - from Taj Mahal (1968)
 "Everybody's Got To Change Sometime" (Sleepy John Estes) - 2:56 - from Taj Mahal (1968)
 "Bound to Love Me Sometime" (Traditional, arranged by Taj Mahal) 4:27 - from Recycling The Blues & Other Related Stuff (1972)
 "Frankie & Albert" (Mississippi John Hurt) - 3:58 - from Oooh So Good 'n Blues (1973)
 "East Bay Woman" (Taj Mahal) - 2:17 - previously unreleased
 "Dust My Broom" (Elmore James) - 4:29 - from Oooh So Good 'n Blues (1973)
 "Corinna" (Taj Mahal, Jesse Ed Davis) - 3:01 - from The Natch'l Blues (1968)
 "Jellyroll" (Taj Mahal) - 3:13 - from The Natch'l Blues (1968)
 "Fishin' Blues" (Henry Thomas) - 3:07 - from De Ole Folks at Home (1969)
 "Sounder Medley: Needed Time #2 / Curiosity Blues / Horse Shoes / Needed Time #3" (Lightnin' Hopkins, Taj Mahal) - 5:26 - from Sounder (original soundtrack)  (1972)
 "Country Blues #1" (Taj Mahal, Jesse Ed Davis) - 2:36 - from De Ole Folks at Home (1969)

References

1992 compilation albums
Taj Mahal (musician) compilation albums
Columbia Records albums